The Excitement Plan is an album by alternative country singer-songwriter Todd Snider. It was released on June 9, 2009 on Yep Roc Records, and was produced by Don Was.

Track listing
	Slim Chance	
	Greencastle Blues	
	America's Favorite Pastime	
	Doll Face	
	Bring 'Em Home	
	Corpus Christi Bay
	The Last Laugh	
	Unorganized Crime	
	Barefoot Champagne	
	Don't Tempt Me
	Money, Compliments, Publicity (Song Number Ten)	
	Good Fortune

Personnel
Elvis Hixx –	vocals (background)
Jim Keltner –	drums
Greg Leisz –	dobro, guitar (steel), vocals (background)
Loretta Lynn –	composer
Eric McConnell – engineer, producer
Michael Osheowitz –	executive producer
Todd Purifoy –	photography
Krish Sharma –	engineer, mastering, mixing
Melita Snider – paintings
Todd Snider –	guitar, harp, piano, primary artist
Michael Triplett – design
Don Was – bass (upright), producer, vocals (background)

References

2009 albums
Todd Snider albums
Yep Roc Records albums
Albums produced by Don Was